Kazi Sirajul Islam is a Bangladesh Awami League politician and a former Jatiya Sangsad member representing the Faridpur-1 constituency from 1996 until 2005.

Career
Islam was elected to parliament from Faridpur-1 as a Bangladesh Awami League candidate in 1996 and 2001 general elections. On 3 June 2005, he joined the Bangladesh Nationalist Party (BNP). According to article 70 of the Constitution of Bangladesh, Faridpur-1 then fell vacant and by-elections were called. BNP originally nominated Islam for the by-election but later changed the nomination to Shah Muhammad Abu Zafar before the election.

Islam later returned to Bangladesh Awami League and, as of 2017, is serving as the vice-president of Bangladesh Krishok League in Faridpur District.

References

Living people
Awami League politicians
Bangladesh Nationalist Party politicians
7th Jatiya Sangsad members
8th Jatiya Sangsad members
Year of birth missing (living people)
Place of birth missing (living people)